Perserikatan Sepakbola Kabupaten Tegal or Persekat is a football club based in Tegal Regency, Central Java. They are currently playing at Liga 2 and their homebase is Tri Sanja Stadium.

Players

Current squad

Naturalized players

Personnel

Technical Staff
{|
|-
| valign="top" |

Kit supplier
 Talenta Sport (2018)
 Grande Apparel (2019−2020)
 WWJD Sport (2021−)

Honours 
Liga 3 Central Java
 Runner-up (1)''': 2019

References

External links
 

Football clubs in Indonesia
Football clubs in Central Java
 Association football clubs established in 1962
1962 establishments in Indonesia